Shāh Amānat Shah, was a late 18th century Sufi Muslim figure in South Asia. He is regarded as one of the most prominent saints of Chittagong, in eastern Bengal (now Bangladesh).

Life
Amanat was born into a Muslim family of Iraqi Arab origin. His forefathers migrated from Baghdad to Bihar and they also were descended from Abdul Qadir Gilani. His father's name was Niyamat. Amanat later migrated to Bengal. In Murshidabad or Dhaka's Laxmibazar, Amanat became a disciple of and pledged bay'ah to a Kashmiri scholar by the name of Shah Abdur Rahim Shahidan, for a number of years. Abdur Rahim was the grandson of Khwaja Masum, the son of Ahmad Sirhindi. Amanat travelled across the subcontinent to learn about Islam in places such as Delhi, Lucknow and Kashmir.

One day, Abdur Rahim advised Amanat to migrate to Chittagong. Amanat built himself a small cottage in a forest area in Chittagong to live in. He managed to get a job as a punkah wallah at the Chittagong Judge Court, and preferred a simple lifestyle without attracting much attention. He would attend prayers at Yasin Khan's Qadam Mubarak mosque. It was from this career at the court, that he was nicknamed Khan Saheb. However, after people realised his true identity, Amanat began dedicating more of his public life towards religious propagation. His first disciple was Shah Sufi Muhammad Dayem of Dayera Sharif, Azimpur who later left for Azimabad and Phulwari Sharif.

Death and legacy
Amanat died in 1809 and was buried near his cottage in a mazar (mausoleum). It is currently in the city of Chittagong; east of the Laldighi and north of the Central Jail road.

In Halishahar, there is a school named after Amanat called the Shah Amanat Shishu Niketan. There is also a power and energy company called Shah Amanat Prakritik Gas Co. Ltd. owned by S. Alam Group of Industries. Shah Amanat International Airport was named after him.

Gallery

References

People from Chittagong
18th-century Indian Muslims
People from Bihar Sharif
Bengali Sufi saints
1809 deaths